Hira Devi Waiba (9 September 1940 – 19 January 2011) was an Indian folk singer in the Nepali-language and is hailed as the pioneer of Nepali folk songs.

Her song "Chura ta Hoina Astura" is said to be the first Tamang Selo (a genre of Nepali folk music) ever recorded. Hira Devi Waiba is the only Nepali folk singer to have cut albums (in 1974 and 1978) with HMV.  She was the sole Grade A Nepali Folk Singer with All India Radio. She was also the first musical artist that Music Nepal, a leading music house in Nepal recorded and released an album of. Before that Music Nepal only released compilation and remastered songs

Life and music
Hira Devi Waiba came from a family of musicians from Ambootia Tea Estate near Kurseong and was one in the line of a long generation of Nepali folk singers and musicians. She was born to parents Singh Man Singh Waiba (father) and Tshering Dolma (mother). She has sung nearly 300 folk songs during her musical career spanning 40 years. Her singing career began when she recorded three songs in Kurseong for Radio Nepal in 1966. She worked as an announcer at the All India Radio station in Kurseong from 1963 to 1965.

Waiba's popular songs include Phariya Lyaaidiyechan, Ora Daudi Jaanda and Ramri tah Ramri. As a tribute to her father, Waiba had opened the SM Waiba International Music and Dance Academy at her home in Kadamtala, near Siliguri in 2008.

Death 
Hira Waiba died on 19 January 2011 at the age of 71 years after suffering burn injuries in a fire accident at her home. She is survived by two children Navneet Aditya Waiba and Satya Aditya Waiba both of whom are musicians.

Daughter and son tribute 
As a tribute to the Legend Hira Devi Waiba, her children Satya Waiba and Navneet Aditya Waiba re-recorded and released some of her hit singles in 2016–2017. Navneet sang and Satya produced and managed the project 'Ama Lai Shraddhanjali -Tribute to Mother', hence moving the family legacy further.

Awards
Hira Devi was awarded the Mitrasen Purashkar by the Nepali Akademi of Darjeeling in 1986, the Mitrasen Smriti Puraskar by the Sikkim government in 1996, Bhanu Academy Puraskar, the Agam Singh Giri Puraskar in 2001 and the Gorkha Saheed Sewa Samiti's Lifetime Achievement Award. The Nepal government had awarded her the Gorkha Dakshina Bahu (Knighthood of Nepal), Sadhana Samman and the Madhurima Phul Kumari Mahato Award.

See also 
 Navneet Aditya Waiba
Ama Lai Shradhanjali
Nepali music
 Tamang Selo

References

External links
 
 Hira Devi Waiba's songs
'Navneet Aditya Waiba | Aye Syangbo'
'Navneet Aditya Waiba | Phariya Lyaaidiyechan'
'Navneet Aditya Waiba | Chuiya Ma Hah | Dhan Naach Geet'
'Navneet Aditya Waiba | DHANKUTA - For our Lahure Brothers'
'Navneet Aditya Waiba | Jhilke Naachayko - Damphu Geet '

Order of Gorkha Dakshina Bahu
All India Radio people
Nepali-language singers from India
People from Darjeeling district
20th-century Indian singers
Singers from West Bengal
1940 births
2011 deaths
All India Radio women
20th-century Indian women singers
Women musicians from West Bengal
21st-century Indian women singers
21st-century Indian singers
Indian women folk singers
People from Darjeeling
Nepalese folk singers
Tamang people